The Loughborough Town Hall is a building fronting onto the Market Place in Loughborough, Leicestershire, England. Built as a corn exchange and ballroom in 1855, it became a municipal building and subsequently a theatre. It is a Grade II listed building.

History
The origins of the building lie in the early 19th century, when four Loughborough tradesmen began a movement to provide the town with a public gathering place. It received much more momentum with the involvement of the local MP, Charles Packe of Prestwold Hall, who donated £500 towards the enterprise. With his backing, other local gentry got on board, and £8,012 was raised for the purchase of land and the construction of the building.

The foundation stone for the new building was laid by Charles Packe in October 1854: it was designed by the Northampton-born architect William Slater in the Italianate style, built in ashlar stone and was completed in 1855. The design involved a symmetrical main frontage with nine bays facing onto the Market Place; the central section of three bays, which slightly projected forward, featured a round headed doorway with a fanlight flanked by two rounded headed sash windows separated by Doric order columns supporting an entablature and a balcony. On the first floor there were round headed sash windows separated by Ionic order columns supporting an entablature and a cornice and, at roof level, there was a two stage decorative bellcote. The outer sections on both floors were also fenestrated by round headed sash windows. The clock, which hangs from the main frontage of the building, was designed in 1879 and installed in 1880. The bell, which was cast by John Taylor & Co, based in Loughborough was also installed at that time.

The primary uses in its earliest days were as a ground floor corn exchange hall, where local farmers could meet and  trade. Upstairs was a ballroom for the use of the gentry. However, from the outset all manor of public gatherings and entertainments were able to make use of the premises. Until 1888 Loughborough had no town charter and was administered by the lord of the manor, and more latterly by local boards with specific responsibility for water and sanitation works, highways, schools, and burials. When Loughborough received a charter in 1888, the new council took on these roles for the town, and was in need of a suitably dignified administrative base. The Corn Exchange company agreed to sell the building and, after it had been converted into a town hall, it re-opened as a municipal building in 1890.

The suffragette, Emmeline Pankhurst, spoke at Loughborough Town Hall during the 1910 General Election.

The building was damaged during a serious fire in 1972. It was the headquarters of the Municipal Borough of Loughborough but it ceased to be the local seat of government when the Borough of Charnwood was formed in 1974. The building was converted into a theatre to the designs of Goodwin, Warner and Associates between 1973 and 1974. An extensive refurbishment of the building, which was undertaken by G. F. Tomlinson at a cost of £5 million, was completed in November 2004.

On 15 March 2023, a fire broke out in a branch of HSBC next to the town hall and spread to the roof of the building.

References

External links
Official Website

Music venues in Leicestershire
Town Hall
City and town halls in Leicestershire
Government buildings completed in 1855
Grade II listed buildings in Leicestershire